Hilary Wainwright (born 1949) is a British sociologist, political activist and socialist feminist, best known for being a co-editor of Red Pepper magazine.

Early life and education
Wainwright's father was the Liberal MP Richard Wainwright. Her brother, Martin, was formerly the Northern Editor of The Guardian, to which she has occasionally contributed.

Wainwright was educated at the Mount School, York, and St Anne's College, Oxford, where she studied Philosophy, Politics, and Economics (PPE). She graduated in 1970. She gained a Bachelor of Philosophy (BPhil) in Sociology from St Antony's College, Oxford in 1973.

Life and career
Until 1979, Wainwright was a research fellow at the Department of Sociology at Durham University. From 1979 to 1981, she was a researcher at the Technology Department of the Open University. In 1982, she became Ken Livingstone's Deputy Chief Economic Advisor to the  Greater London Council (GLC).

Wainwright is a Fellow of the international think tank for progressive politics, the Transnational Institute, Amsterdam; Senior Research Associate at the International Centre for Participation Studies at the Department for Peace Studies, University of Bradford, UK and previously research fellow at the Centre for the Study of Global Governance at the London School of Economics. She has also been a visiting professor and scholar at the University of California, Los Angeles; Havens Center, University of Wisconsin, Madison and Todai University, Tokyo. Formerly on the editorial board of New Left Review, she was also on the National Council of the Catalyst think tank.

A researcher and writer, Wainwright is concerned with the emergence of new forms of democratic accountability within parties, movements and the state. She has documented examples of resurgent democratic movements in many countries around the world and the lessons they provide for progressive politics.

In July 2015, Wainwright endorsed Jeremy Corbyn's campaign in the Labour Party leadership election. She said: "To be honest, the Labour Party isn't worth that valuable three quid. But a platform for someone who not only insists that there is an alternative, but stretches himself to support everyone who is fighting for it, is beyond anything that money can buy." She added: "I believe Jeremy Corbyn should be supported not as an attempt to 'reclaim the Labour Party' but as a transition to a political organisation beyond the Labour Party and beyond parliamentary politics".

Wainwright is a founding member and co-editor of the Red Pepper political magazine.

Personal life and honours
In 1971, Wainwright married the British philosopher Roy Bhaskar. The couple remained close lifelong friends after their separation and never divorced. She received an Honorary DLitt from the University of Huddersfield on 28 November 2007, along with Martin Wainwright, for "services to journalism".

Select bibliography 
 Reclaim the State: Experiments in Popular Democracy (Seagull books, 2009), 
 Public service reform - But not as we know it! (Compass/UNISON, 2009), 
 Reclaim the State: Experiments in Popular Democracy (Verso Books, 2003), 
 Arguments for a New Left: Answering the Free-market Right (Blackwell, 1994), 
 Labour: A Tale of Two Parties (Hogarth Press/Chatto Windus, London, 1987).
A Taste of Power: The Politics of Local Economics (Verso Books, London, October 1987) (co-edited with Maureen MacIntosh).
The Lucas Plan: A New Trade Unionism in the Making? (first published by Allison and Busby, 1981) (co-authored with Dave Elliott), .
 Beyond the Fragments: Feminism and the Making of Socialism (Merlin Press, 1980) (co-authored with Sheila Rowbotham and Lynne Segal).
The Workers Report of Vickers (Pluto Press, 1978) (co-authored with Huw Benyon).

References

External links 
 Hilary Wainwright's profile on the Transnational Institute
 Hilary Wainwright on Twitter
 Red Pepper magazine

1949 births
Living people
20th-century British women writers
21st-century British women writers
Academics of Durham University
Academics of the London School of Economics
Academics of the Open University
Academics of the University of Manchester
Alumni of St Anne's College, Oxford
Alumni of St Antony's College, Oxford
British journalists
British magazine editors
British political writers
British social commentators
British socialists
Feminist studies scholars
People educated at The Mount School, York
Socialist feminists
University of California, Los Angeles staff
Women magazine editors